|}

This is a list of electoral region results for the Western Australian Legislative Council in the 1974 Western Australian state election.

Results by Electoral province

Central

Lower Central

Lower North

Lower West

Metropolitan

North

North Metropolitan

North-East Metropolitan

South

South Metropolitan

South-East

South-East Metropolitan

South-West

Upper West

West

See also 

 Results of the Western Australian state election, 1974 (Legislative Assembly)
 1974 Western Australian state election
 Candidates of the 1974 Western Australian state election
 Members of the Western Australian Legislative Council, 1974–1977

References 

Results of Western Australian elections
1974 elections in Australia